Johanna Stein is a Canadian-American writer, producer, director, and actress best known for Momhead, Wander Over Yonder, Home: Adventures with Tip & Oh, and Mulholland Drive.

Early life and influences 
Stein was born and raised in Winnipeg, Manitoba, where she attended St. John's High School and the University of Winnipeg. She then relocated to the United States to attend the American Film Institute. She began her career as a script reader at DreamWorks, as a director's assistant, and in small film roles in Shoot or Be Shot and Mulholland Drive.

Career 
Stein is best known for writing, producing, and starring in the 2014 viral comedy video Momhead. It received over 2.7 million views on YouTube and was featured on CNN, The Today Show, The Huffington Post, and The Doctors. The video is based on her book How Not to Calm a Child on a Plane, which The New York Times described as "the rare funny book on becoming and being a mother that doesn't sound as if you've read it before (probably because it is chock-full of things most of us would never, ever say)." The book also received positive reviews from Salon, Jezebel, and Los Angeles Magazine.

In 2006, Stein was nominated for an Annie Award for Best Writing in an Animated Television Production for the episode "Old Cold" on Nickelodeon's O'Grady. In 2015, she was nominated for a Primetime Emmy Award for Outstanding Short-Form Animated Program for the episode "The Gift 2: The Giftening" on Disney XD's Wander Over Yonder.

In 2011, she was a writer for the Just For Laughs comedy festival in Montreal, Quebec, Canada, hosted by Eric Stonestreet. Stonestreet then appeared in Stein's Declare Yourself PSA: Angry Squirrel, a public service announcement that encouraged viewers to register to vote.

In 2013, Unperfect Productions, the all-female production company formed by Suzanne Luna and Johanna Stein, produced the 24-episode series Life of Mom with Johanna Stein for Yahoo!. In 2014, they produced the viral video Momhead. In 2016, they produced the 18-episode series JoJoHead in collaboration with Warner Bros.' Blue Ribbon Content digital studio, which Stein wrote, produced, and starred in. The show features comedic vignettes about the life of an everyday woman and is a prequel to Momhead. Both Momhead and JoJoHead were filmed from a bird's eye view using a GoPro camera on top of Stein's head. Stein likened the lead character JoJo, based on her life, to a female Mr. Bean. JoJoHead was released on CW Seed, The CW's streaming platform, in 2016. It was also promoted through weekly Instagram Stories on the CW Seed's Instagram account. That same year, Unperfect Productions also produced One in a Million, a public service announcement to raise awareness about domestic violence.

In 2017, Stein wrote and directed It's Illogical, a series of public service announcements that highlight the illogicality of sexual assault. The series was produced by 101-North for It's On Us, the organization created by Joe Biden to stop sexual assault. The spots received over 15 million views globally.

Filmography

Film

Television

Awards and nominations 

|-
| 2006
| Nickelodeon's O'Grady (Episode: "Old Cold")
| Annie Award for Best Writing in an Animated Television Production
|  
|-
| 2015
| Disney XD's Wander Over Yonder (Episode: "The Gift 2: The Gifting"
| Primetime Emmy Award for Outstanding Short-Form Animated Program
| 
|-
|}

References

External links 
 Johanna Stein Official Site
 

1967 births
Living people
Actresses from Winnipeg
Canadian television actresses
Canadian television directors
Canadian television producers
Canadian women television producers
Canadian television writers
University of Winnipeg alumni
Writers from Winnipeg
Canadian women screenwriters
Canadian women comedians
Canadian women television writers
Comedians from Manitoba
Canadian women television directors